The Breathing Permit of Hôr or Hor Book of Breathing is a Ptolemaic era funerary text written for a Theban priest named Hôr.  The breathing permit or Book of Breathing assisted its owner in navigating through the afterlife, being judged worthy and living forever.

Hôr (sometimes rendered as Horus or Horos) came from an important family of Theban Priests of Amon-Re in the cult of "Min who massacres his enemies". His family tree can be reliably reconstructed from independent sources to eight generations.

Hôr's mummy and breathing permit were disinterred by Antonio Lebolo in the early 1800s and eventually sold to Joseph Smith, founder of the Latter Day Saint movement, as part of a larger collection of at least four other funerary documents and three other mummies that came to be known as the Joseph Smith Papyri. The scroll of Hôr is a source that Smith used in what he said was a translation of the Book of Abraham and as such has been highly studied and the source of great controversy.

Background

Sometime in the years after the sale to Joseph Smith in 1835, the first part of the scroll was cut up and placed in picture frames.  After the death of Joseph Smith, the papyri collection was eventually split up and parts were destroyed in the Great Chicago Fire of 1871.  The entire collection was presumed lost, but were rediscovered at the New York Metropolitan Museum in 1966.  Since that time the remaining papyri, including the first few sections of the Breathing Permit of Hôr, have been owned by the Church of Jesus Christ of Latter-day Saints (LDS Church).

Relationship with the Book of Abraham
This scroll is widely believed by scholars in and outside the LDS Church to be the scroll from which the Book of Abraham comes. This is based on the inclusion of Facsimile #1 (JSP I) and #3 from this scroll in the Book of Abraham, and titled by Joseph Smith as "from the Book of Abraham". Further evidence is that characters from this scroll were sequentially copied into the Book of Abraham translation manuscripts.

There is also widespread agreement that the text of the Book of Abraham does not come from the remaining papyri fragments. Some scholars in the LDS Church, notably Hugh Nibley and John Gee, argue that the source of the Book of Abraham was appended to the end of this scroll, after the Breathing Permit.

Reconstruction
The papyri fragments from the Joseph Smith Papyri collection known as JSP I, X, XI, and the now missing Facsimile #3 from Smith's published Book of Abraham can be reassembled to partially reconstruct the scroll containing the Breathing Permit belonging to the priest Hôr (also known as Horus). Portions of the papyri from JSP X and XI were damaged, and re-pasted incorrectly into lacunae in JSP IV, but do not belong to JSP IV.

Dating
The handwriting was identified as being "of the late Ptolemaic or early Roman Period, about the time of Christ". Jan Quaegebeur has suggested a date in the first half of the second century B.C.  Hôr's genealogy can be reliably traced from a variety of ancient sources, including another funerary document belonging to Hôr found in 1998, showing with certainty that Hôr was a member of a prominent priestly family from the Ptolemaic era.

Comparison of Joseph Smith Papyrus I with other similar vignettes
As of 1998, there were 29 known examples of the Book of Breathings, of which the Joseph Smith papyri fragment is an example. Of those twenty-nine, eighteen have vignettes associated with them. Although no two facsimiles are completely identical, there are common features among all. A comparison of the Book of Abraham facsimiles with these other documents indicates that although the Book of Abraham Facsimile No. 1 (derived from JSP I) is unique, these differences are superficial, and not significant enough to indicate that they are anything other than a representation of an Egyption re-animation scene from the Book of Breathing Made by Isis.

Controversy surrounding the length of the scroll
The official position taken by the LDS Church on the papyri is that "Mormon and non-Mormon Egyptologists agree that the characters on the fragments do not match the translation given in the book of Abraham". Given this, some Mormon apologists have postulated that the Book of Abraham manuscript was appended to the end of this scroll, and is no longer extant. The evidence for this claim is 1840s and 1850s accounts from visitors to Nauvoo who viewed the papyri after they had been separated and framed.

The current Book of Abraham in English has about 5,506 words, which would correlate to a length of 5.11 meters of papyri. As Joseph Smith never completed his translation of the Book of Abraham, the scroll would have been even longer.

By taking the length of current fragments, plus estimating how much space would have been taken by the missing section of the Book of Breathing, the size of the scroll has been estimated to be between 150 and 156 cm.

If a scroll is damaged while rolled up, and the damage seeps to more than one layer, the length of the scroll can also be estimated by measuring the distance between the damaged sections. By noting the decreasing distance between damaged sections, the length of the scroll can be extrapolated. Using this method, the Horus scroll is corroborated to be around 150 cm.

While funerary texts were sometimes included at the end of funerary compositions, it would be a unique discovery to find a non-funerary text such as the Book of Abraham appended. Egyptologist Marc Coenen stated, "Concluding that a record of Abraham or any other text foreign to Ptolemaic Egyptian funerary and/or liturgical practice was once attached to the Smith papyri is an assertion not based upon widely accepted Egyptological analysis."

After examining the evidence, Egyptologist Robert Ritner said, "There can be no question of any 'lost' section of the papyrus that contained an ancient text composed by Abraham, since [Joseph Smith] claims and depicts the Ptolemaic vignette as his own addition (Facsimile 1)".

Translation
The papyri have been translated several times.  For the first translation, the editors of an independent quarterly journal, Dialogue: A Journal of Mormon Thought, arranged for John A. Wilson and Klaus Baer of the Oriental Institute at the University of Chicago and Richard Anthony Parker, Director of the Department of Egyptology at Brown University to translate the text from the photographs. Their translations were published in Dialogue in the summer and autumn of 1968. Klaus Baer was an instructor of Hugh Nibley, and the two maintained good relations throughout their careers. For Baer's translation, Nibley arranged for Baer to see the papyri. Baer wrote: "Just before this paper went to press, Professor Nibley was kind enough to show me the original papyri at Brigham Young University."

Nibley himself performed a transliteration in 1975 (revised in 2005 by John Gee and Michael Rhodes). This transliteration was purposefully made without regard to grammar, as such it does not flow well in English, as Nibley himself was aware.

Other notable translations are a 2002 translation by Mormon Egyptologist Michael Rhodes and a 2011 translation by non-Mormon Egyptologist Robert Ritner of the University of Chicago (also John Gee's instructor).

The papyri were written in hieratic Egyptian characters (a sort of cursive hieroglyphic), and is read from right to left. (Lacunae in the manuscript are shown with an ellipsis or "[?]").  The translations below were presented side by side, with line breaks for ease of comparison, but were not part of their translation.  The Pilcrow symbol (¶) denotes a paragraph that translator added to their translation, but is not part of the Egyptian text.

In Baer's translation, missing text that was inferred from other similar book of breathings were noted in italic.  Nibley did not translate missing text, only translating words that were on the papyri.  Rhodes and Ritner denoted missing text with brackets []. Text in-between brackets were inferred from other similar book of breathings.

Fragment A

JSP Fragment I, text surrounding the vignette known as facsimile #1. This is an introductory section of the Book of Breathing. Hugh Nibley did not make a translation of this opening vignette.

JSP Fragment I, Vignette
According to Baer, Coenen and Quaegebeur, the scene represents the resurrection of Hor (as Osiris) aided by Anubis. Osiris lies on a lion couch, with Anubis, the jackal headed god standing over him.  Four canopic jars are shown below the figures, which have lids representing the four sons of Horus, Imset, Hapi, Qebeh-senuwef, and Duwa-mutef.  According to Baer, Osiris was "almost certainly represented as ithyphallic, ready to beget Horus", grasping his phallus. Michael D. Rhodes says this interpretation is unlikely because in all other conception scenes the reclining figure is nude and in this one he is wearing a kilt.

JSP XI (two columns)

Fragment B

The translation from the papyri ends here, as the remaining fragments is presumed not to have survived.  The Book of Breathing continues for another four paragraphs (paragraphs 11-14).  These final paragraphs typically include continued discussion of Hôr entering the afterlife, an abbreviated  Negative Confession where Hôr would proclaim before gods and demons that he had not committed a variety of sins, and finally a proclamation of the Hôr's purity and readiness to live forever on earth.  This would make up about two more columns.

Closing Vignette (Facsimile #3)

The culminating vignette, also known as facsimile #3, is the presentation of Hor to the Egyptian god of death and rebirth Osiris (seated), and his wife Isis (standing) after having been judged worthy to continue existence.  Hor is adorned in Egyptian festival attire with a cone of perfumed grease and a lotus flower on his head. He is escorted by the goddess of justice Ma'at, and guide of the dead Anubis.  At the top of the scene is a row of stars, representing the sky.  The presentation of the deceased to Osiris is a common scene in Egyptian funerary literature, and has its antecedent in chapter 125 of the earlier Book of the Dead.

The Egyptian gods and goddesses in this vignette are identified by iconography above their heads. Osiris is adorned in the crown Atef which combines the Hedjet, the crown of Upper Egypt (where Thebes is located), with two ostrich feathers on the side. Isis has a sun disk between two cows horns above her head, and in her hand is a symbol of life called an Ankh. Ma'at is denoted by a feather above her head.

In Egyptian funerary tradition, the god Anubis is a guide to the dead, assisting in leading the deceased through the underworld. Anubis is typically portrayed with a jackal's head to include spiked ears, narrow eyes and long snout.  While the spiked ear, and narrow eyes are present, the long snout is not.  Close analysis of the printing plates of facsimile 3 indicates that the snout might have been present but chiseled off.

Interestingly, the invocation to Osiris at the bottom of the vignette reads from left to right, not right to left, and indicates the direction the prayer was going (from the direction of Hor/Anubis, to Osiris)

References

Funerary and memorial compositions
Pearl of Great Price (Mormonism)
Works originally published in the Improvement Era
Egyptian papyri containing images
Book of Abraham